Religion in Zamfara State of Nigeria is mainly Islam. The Sharia is valid in the entire state. No Roman Catholic diocese has its seat in the state. Zamfara State declared Sharia Law on the 28th October 1999 as the law governing the state. It was made by the then-Zamfara State Governor, Ahmed Sani Yerima.

Shari'a is the Islamic code of law that for centuries has provided a complete guide to life for Muslims. The argument however is that Nigeria is made an equal distribution of Christian and Muslims so the implication of imposing the law was detrimental to the non-Muslim faithfuls. The question of its legality was considered as it was seen to be against the constitution.

See also 
Nigerian sectarian violence

References

Zamfara State
Religion in Nigeria